Trailblazer Pipeline is a natural gas pipeline that brings natural gas from Colorado into Nebraska, where the pipeline joins the NGPL. It is owned by Tallgrass Energy Partners, LP is a private master limited partnership (MLP) headquartered in Overland Park, KS. On August 17, 2012, Tallgrass entered into a purchase and sale agreement with Kinder Morgan Energy Partners, L.P. (NYSE: KMP) to buy Kinder Morgan Interstate Gas Transmission, Trailblazer Pipeline Company, the Casper-Douglas natural gas processing and West Frenchie Draw treating facilities in Wyoming, and KMP's 50 percent interest in the Rockies Express Pipeline. Tallgrass closed this acquisition on November 13, 2012. Its FERC code is 68.

See also
List of North American natural gas pipelines

References

External links
Pipeline Electronic Bulletin Board

Natural gas pipelines in the United States
Kinder Morgan
Natural gas pipelines in Colorado
Natural gas pipelines in Nebraska